The Serranía de Los Motilones is a mountain range in the Cordillera Oriental of Colombia and Venezuela. A forest reserve zone exists within the range and spans .

References

Mountain ranges of Colombia
Mountain ranges of Venezuela